The Velindre University NHS Trust is an NHS Wales trust established in 1994 as a specialist provider of cancer services in Wales.  It runs the Velindre Cancer Centre and the Welsh Blood Service. It also  incorporates, on a hosted basis, the NHS Wales Shared Services Partnership (NWSSP).

The Velindre Cancer Centre in Cardiff provides radiotherapy treatment.  It provides stereotactic body radiotherapy treatment and a stereotactic radiosurgery service. A Varian TrueBeam linear accelerator which delivers stereotactic radiosurgery was funded by a £4.6million Welsh Government investment in 2015.

When inspected in 2014, the Velindre Cancer Centre was generally praised.

A clinical trials unit was set up in 1994 with three members of staff. In 2014 that had expanded to 34, with more than 9,700 patients having been recruited for clinical trials.

The trust was awarded university status by the Welsh Government in 2018.

References

External links

Welsh NHS trusts
Cancer organisations based in the United Kingdom